The 2009 NBA Europe Live Tour was a basketball exhibition tour featuring teams from the NBA and Real Madrid from the Euroleague, as a part of the NBA Global Games. The hosting countries were England and Spain.

The 2009 tour was combined with the Euroleague American Tour to create an eleven-game global preseason schedule.

Teams
The NBA teams that participated were:
 Utah Jazz
 Chicago Bulls
 Denver Nuggets
 Phoenix Suns (2nd participation) 
 San Antonio Spurs (2nd participation) 
 New York Knicks
 L.A. Clippers (2nd participation) 
 Indiana Pacers
 Cleveland Cavaliers
 Philadelphia 76ers (2nd participation) 

The Euroleague teams that participated were:

 Partizan Belgrade
 Real Madrid (2nd participation) 
 Olympiacos
 Maccabi Tel Aviv (2nd participation)

Games

See also
2009 EuroLeague American Tour

External links
Official NBA Website

NBA Global Games
Europe
2009–10 Euroleague